The name Latin was in the Middle Ages a common demonym among the followers of the Latin Church of Western Christianity. It derived from the Ecclesiastical Latin that was developed by the Latin Church fathers in the Western Church. Although Latin language was the official language of the Roman Empire, going back to the Italic tribe who in antiquity developed in Ancient Rome, the name was used irrespective of ethnicity, including by Germanic, Italic, Celtic and Slavic peoples. Thus the people associated with the states created during the Crusades were generally referred to as Latins or Franks, the latter being one prominent group represented.

In the Byzantine Empire, and the broader Greek Orthodox world, it was generally a negative characterisation, especially after the East-West schism in 1054. It did not share this negative connotation in the West, where many self-identified with the term, such as Petrarch, when he states "Sumus enim non greci, non barbari, sed itali et latini." ("We are not Greeks or barbarians; we are Italians and Latins.").

See also 
 Greek East and Latin West
 Latin Church in the Middle East
 Latin Empire
 Latinokratia
 Western Europe
 Barbarian
 Vlachs
 Walhaz

References

Christian terminology
East–West Schism
Ethnic and religious slurs
Exonyms
Demonyms
 
Latin Church
 
 
Religion in the Middle Ages